Pacifica Pier is a fishing pier in Pacifica, in western San Mateo County, California. The L shaped pier spans out into the Pacific Ocean for a quarter mile from the City of Pacifica. Its official name is the Rev. Herschell Harkins Memorial Pacifica Pier.

History
The quarter mile pier was built in 1973 as part of the city of Pacifica's sewer system. It carries a  pipe that continues one quarter mile offshore through which treated wastewater was pumped into the Pacific Ocean. This ended with the creation of a new water treatment facility in 2004.

The pier has been closed on occasion for both repairs (1993) and during high surf.

Funding Sources
The pier was built as a cooperative development of the City of Pacifica, the Wildlife Conservation Board and the California Department of Fish and Game.
The Pacifica Pier municipal Pier Repair Project is funded in part by a grant from the state Coastal Conservancy.
The Pier is operated by the Department of Parks, Beaches and Recreation of the city of Pacifica, California

Fishing
Since the pier was no longer being used to pump wastewater into the Pacific Ocean, its primary purpose has been for fishing. The pier is famous for salmon runs where hundreds of salmon are caught in a single day. When this occurs there is a frenzy of activity where every available space is used to catch fish and hundreds of anglers are fishing shoulder to shoulder.

Primary species caught at the pier:

Other Recreation
The pier is a good place from which to view whales during their biannual migration.

External links

official Pacifica Pier website
QuickTime panorama of the pier.

Piers in California
Pacifica, California
Parks in San Mateo County, California
Transportation buildings and structures in San Mateo County, California